Grégoire Bouillier (born June 22, 1960 in Tizi Ouzou, Algeria) is a French memoirist who wrote Rapport sur moi (Report on Myself) and L'invité mystère (The Mystery Guest). Rapport sur moi won the Prix de Flore in 2002.

Bouillier is the unnamed protagonist of French artist Sophie Calle’s work, Take Care of Yourself, in which Calle collected comments from 107 women to an e-mail he wrote her to end their affair. The work was exhibited in the French pavilion of the 2007 Venice Biennale.

Works

Original French
 Rapport sur moi, 2002
 L'invité mystère, 2004
 Cap Canaveral, 2008

English translations
 The Mystery Guest, 2006 (translated by Lorin Stein)
 Report on Myself, 2008 (translated by Bruce Benderson)

Dutch translation
 De raadselgast .

Arabic Translation
 Report on Myself- تقرير عن نفسي , 2014 ( Publisher - Al Kotob Khan )

References 

1960 births
Living people
People from Tizi Ouzou
Pieds-Noirs
French male writers